The University of Queensland Australian Football Club (UQAFC) is an amateur Australian rules football club playing in the QFA Division 1, Division 4 and QAFLW League competitions, overseen by AFL Queensland. UQAFC home games are played at the University of Queensland's Playing Field 2, on the corner of Sir William MacGregor Drive and Thynne Road, St Lucia, Brisbane.

Founded in 1956, the club collected the Red Lions moniker in reference to a pub in the Northern New South Wales town of Glencoe. After travelling to Armidale to compete against the University of New England for the Clem Jones Shield UQ would frequent the Red Lion Tavern on their return journey, giving birth to the Red Lion legend.

The UQAFC has since won seven Senior premierships, including a "threepeat" in 1961, 1962 & 1963. Red Lion Reserve Grade sides have claimed twelve premiership victories many of which came during extended periods of dominance through the 1980s and more recently in the new millennium. The club has a built unique heritage with its large student membership and strong old boys network resulting in a very social club atmosphere and it is very proud to cater to footballers of all abilities. Currently with eight teams and approximately 250 registered players, the Red Lions are regarded as one of the largest amateur Australian rules football club in Queensland.

Recent history
In 2006 a large increase in player numbers resulted in the formation of a third adult side for the first time since the 1970s. The Thirds team, which also included players from the Griffith University Gladiators, played in the reserves competition of Division 2 of the AFLQ State Association competition. 2006 also saw a significant improvement in performance with the Senior side finishing third overall, and the Reserves side winning the premiership.

The club continued to perform well in 2007 under new Senior Coach Travis Warren with both the senior and Reserves side reaching the preliminary final. In 2008, performances across all grades continued to improve, with the Reserves winning the Premiership, the Thirds making the Grand Final for the first time and the Seniors again narrowing missing the Grand Final to finish third.

2009 represented another year of growth for the club, with unprecedented player numbers allowing the creation of a fourth adult side for the first time. The Thirds and Fourths played as senior and reserve teams of Division 2 of the AFLQ State Association competition. The Division 2 Reserves played finals in 2010 (for the first time since stepping up from Division 3) and the club continued to grow in numbers to accommodate their four adult men's sides

The Senior Coaching role was taken over by Tim MacKinley prior to the start of the 2011 season. Both Division 1 sides finished on top of their respective ladders to take out the minor premiership, with the Reserve side capping the season with a premiership and the Seniors reaching the Grand Final. The Thirds continued their improvement to record 4 victories, the most in one season since their promotion to Division 2. In 2012 the club had 3 teams make the Grand Final, with the Seconds and Fourths ultimately claiming premierships.

At the completion of the 2012 season AFL Queensland offered University a promotion into the Allied Pickfords Cup and recently retired club-captain Matthew Stewart took the reins as senior coach. The club welcomed the return of an Under 18's side and for the first time ever also fielded Division 4 and Ladies teams. The Division 1 Reserves, Division 3 Reserves and Ladies teams all played finals in 2013, with the Fourths claiming their second premiership in a row.

Following the AFLQ's decision to re-structure their South East Queensland competitions for 2014, the Red Lions applied for a licence in the newly re-formed Queensland Australian Football League. On 19 September 2013 the AFLQ announced that the UQAFC would form a part of the QAFL for the 2014 season. Following another re-structuring of AFLQ competitions in 2017, the Red Lions joined the QFA Division 1 competition. UQAFC has also fielded a Women's team in the states premier senior women's competition, the QAFLW, since 2014.

Junior Links 

The Wests Juniors club in nearby Toowong are partners in a joint initiative Under 18 squad, the UQ Bulldogs. Players from other junior clubs in the local area are also welcomed. The majority of the club's recruitment remains the influx of sometimes inexperienced but always keen students who filter down from the university.

Randy the Red Lion 

The club introduced a mascot prior to the 2011 finals campaign. Randy the Red Lion can often be seen at Oval 7 cheering on the Red Lions and helping them celebrate a win.

Honour Board

QAFL

QAFA

Ladies

University Games 

The club has unofficial links to the teams which represent the university at the Australian University Games, previously held separately for each sport and called Inter-Varsity Carnivals. In 2012 the team's Best Off Field Medal was dubbed the "Bruce Larkin Medal". The following players have received Green & Gold selection in the team of the carnival: Adam Pearce, Anthony Lee & Sebastine Isu (1993), David Coxen (1996), Michael Swann (2009 & 2012), and Jared D'Roza & Madi Crowley (2013).

Alumni 
The UQAFC has produced some footballers of note.
The club's alumni includes:
 Ken Crooke, former President of the National Party's Queensland branch
 John Harms, sports writer
 Malcolm Nairn, inaugural Vice-Chancellor of Charles Darwin University
 Steve Haddan, channel 9 news reader
 Ozzie Moore, former PGA Pro golfer
 Wayne Swan, Former Deputy Prime Minister & Federal Treasurer

AFL Players
 Ben Hudson, player for the Brisbane Lions, former player of Western Bulldogs and Adelaide Crows
 Andrew McKay, premiership player for the Carlton Blues trained with University whilst studying veterinary science.
 Scott Clouston, former player with the Brisbane Lions who came from the UQ Bulldogs Under 18s in 2005
 John Williams, former player with the Essendon Bombers who played with the UQ Bulldogs Under 18s and the senior Red Lions in 2006

AFLW Players
 Emma Zielke
 Breanna Koenen
 Dakota Davidson
 Sharni Webb 
 Luka Yoshida-Martin
 Maria Moloney
 Greta Bodey
 Gabby Collingwood
 Emma Pittman
 Megan Hunt

See also
University of Queensland
University of Queensland Business Association
 University of Queensland Union (UQU)
Queensland Australian Football League

References

External links
 Official site
 Playing Field 2

Queensland State Football League clubs
Australian rules football clubs in Brisbane
Aus
1956 establishments in Australia
University Australian rules football clubs
Australian rules football clubs established in 1956